Marcel Granollers and Marc López were the defending champions but decided not to participate.
Jamie Murray and John Peers won the title, defeating Pablo Andújar and Guillermo García-López in the final, 6–3, 6–4.

Seeds

Draw

Draw

References
 Main Draw

Credit Agricole Suisse Open Gstaad – Doubles
2013 Doubles
2013 Crédit Agricole Suisse Open Gstaad